Mary Jo Daley (born September 16, 1949) is a Democratic member of the Pennsylvania House of Representatives, representing the 148th Legislative District since 2013. Her district is located in Montgomery County, and includes all of Conshohocken, Narberth, and Whitemarsh, and parts of Lower Merion, Plymouth, and Whitpain.

Daley was a member of the Narberth Borough Council from 1992 to 2012, serving as council president from 2002 to 2012. In August 2012, she was nominated by the Montgomery County Democratic Committee to be Democratic candidate for the 148th State House seat after Michael F. Gerber declined to seek re-election. She then won the general election against Republican Mike Ludwig by a margin of 59% to 41%.

Daley currently sits on the Tourism & Recreational Development committees.

References

1949 births
University of Pennsylvania alumni
Living people
Democratic Party members of the Pennsylvania House of Representatives
People from Narberth, Pennsylvania
People from Montgomery County, Pennsylvania
Women state legislators in Pennsylvania
21st-century American politicians
21st-century American women politicians
Gwynedd Mercy University alumni